Ialomița may refer to:

 Ialomița County - a county of Romania
 Ialomița River -  a river of Southern Romania that rises from the Bucegi Mountains

See also 
 Ialomicioara River (disambiguation)